The FIL European Luge Championships 1979 took place in Oberhof, East Germany.

Men's singles

Women's singles

Men's doubles

Medal table

References
Men's doubles European champions. Sports123.com.
Men's singles European champions. Sports123.com.
Women's singles European champions. Sports123.com.

FIL European Luge Championships
Sport in Oberhof, Germany
1979 in luge
Luge in Germany
1979 in German sport